Orlando Conga is a Latin-American singer. In 2007, Conga received a nomination for a Lo Nuestro Award for Tropical New Artist of the Year.

References

Living people
Salsa musicians
Year of birth missing (living people)
Place of birth missing (living people)
21st-century American male singers
21st-century American singers